Vitéz Ferenc Feketehalmy-Czeydner (22 November 1890 – 5 November 1946) was a Hungarian military officer who had a significant role in the Novi Sad massacre during the Second World War.

Military career

After training at the artillery cadet school in Traiskirchen and Theresia Military Academy, Feketehalmy-Czeydner became a lieutenant in 1910 for Zeidner Feldhaubitzregiment No. 12. During World War I, where he served as an artillery and staff officer and attained the rank of captain. After the war, he joined the newly founded Royal Hungarian Army, where he served in 1921 as a staff officer at the 7th Mixed Brigade in Miskolc. Additionally, he taught at the Hungarian Military Academy. 

In the inter-war period, he changed his surname in German to Feketehalmy-Czeydner. In 1928, he was transferred to the Ministry of Defence, and, in 1929, was promoted to lieutenant colonel. From November 1934 he was deputy director of the aviation ministry, and in March 1938 he became Air Force Chief of Section in the Ministry of Defence.

In November 1938 he took over as commander of the 6th Infantry Brigade and was promoted to Major General the following year. From March 1940 he was Chief of General Staff of the Hungarian First Army before he was appointed as Commanding General of the Fifth Army Corps stationed in Szeged in August 1941. In November of that year he was promoted to Lieutenant General.

World War II

In January 1942, troops under his command conducted a large-scale retaliation in Bačka (Bácska) which had been occupied by Hungary. The operation was arranged by Feketehalmy-Czeydner after the assassination of several Hungarian gendarmes and soldiers and Yugoslav partisans' sabotage. Three battalions under Colonel László Deák were dispatched to the area where they received assistance from local police, gendarmerie and army units that were home. 

At Žabalj (Zsablya) been observed in its vicinity, the partisans were under orders of Feketehalmy-Czeydner the entire population was massacred. From 21-23 January a pogrom was held in Novi Sad (Újvidék), when nearly 800 people, including 550 Jews and 292 Serbs were murdered. A total of up to adjust the action on 31 January had been murdered 3,808 people.

The Novi Sad massacre sparked protests in Hungary, which were led by the chairman of the opposition Smallholders Party, Endre Bajcsy-Zsilinszky. As a result, Feketehalmy was retired, but remained unpunished. As recently as September 1943, when Hungary was already in negotiations with Western powers over a separate peace, a case was brought against the officers responsible. 

On 14 December 1943 the trial of three police officers and twelve Honvéds was opened. Feketehalmy-Czeydner was sentenced to 15 years in prison, while seven co-defendants received sentences of over ten years. On 15 January-Czeydner Feketehalmy fled with three other convicts to Vienna, where they requested political asylum. An extradition request by the Hungarian government was denied by Adolf Hitler.

In March 1944 Feketehalmy served in the Waffen SS at first and then joined the II SS Panzer Corps. After the coup of Hitler faithful by the Arrow Cross party under Ferenc Szálasi he went back to Hungary in October 1944 and became Deputy Minister of Defence. He was assigned to the war with the establishment of XVII Hungarian-SS corps that practically existed only on paper.

Capture and death

In May 1945 he fell into American captivity, from which he was shipped to Hungary. The Hungarian authorities handed him over in January 1946 along with four other Hungarian military officers in Yugoslavia. He was tried for war crimes, sentenced to death and executed on 5 November 1946 in Žabalj.

References

Sources
 Zinner Tibor–Róna Péter: Szálasiék bilincsben, Lapkiadó Vállalat, 1986, 
Christian Gerlach–Götz Aly: Das letzte Kapitel. Realpolitik, Ideologie und der Mord an den ungarischen Juden 1944/1945. Deutsche Verlags-Anstalt, Stuttgart, 2002, .

1890 births
1946 deaths
People from Simeria
Hungarian soldiers
Hungarian mass murderers
Austro-Hungarian military personnel of World War I
Austro-Hungarian Army officers
Genocide of Serbs in the Independent State of Croatia perpetrators
Hungarian military personnel of World War II
Hungarian Nazis
Executed Hungarian collaborators with Nazi Germany
Nazis executed by Yugoslavia by hanging
Hungarian Waffen-SS personnel
Executed mass murderers